Charnvudth Saengsri (born March 22, 1987) is a Thai former swimmer, who specialized in long-distance freestyle events. He is a two-time silver medalist in the 1500 m freestyle at the Southeast Asian Games (2003 and 2005).

Saengsri qualified for two events, as Thailand's youngest swimmer (aged 17), at the 2004 Summer Olympics in Athens, by posting FINA B-standard entry times of 3:59.91 (400 m freestyle) and 15:56.22 (1500 m freestyle) from the 2003 Southeast Asian Games in Hanoi, Vietnam. On the first day of the Games, Saengsri placed thirty-third in the 400 m freestyle. He established a personal best and a Thai record of 3:59.89 to take a fourth spot in heat two, just 0.02 of a second faster than his entry time. In the 1500 m freestyle, Saengsri edged out Chile's Giancarlo Zolezzi and Malaysia's Saw Yi Khy to lead the first heat by a 6.06-second margin, breaking his own record time of 15:54.46. Saengsri failed to advance into the final, as he placed twenty-seventh overall in the preliminaries.

References

1987 births
Living people
Charnvudth Saengsri
Charnvudth Saengsri
Swimmers at the 2004 Summer Olympics
Southeast Asian Games medalists in swimming
Charnvudth Saengsri
Charnvudth Saengsri
Charnvudth Saengsri
Competitors at the 2003 Southeast Asian Games
Competitors at the 2005 Southeast Asian Games
Charnvudth Saengsri